Jeremiah Burns Farm, also known as The Burns Place, is a historic home and farm located at Washington Township in Franklin County, Pennsylvania. The contributing buildings are the farmhouse (1832), a hewn timber frame Pennsylvania barn (c. 1900), and a small shed dated to the late-19th or early 20th-century.  The property also includes the millrace and remains of a sickle mill and a line of cobblestones from the barn to the mill site.  The house is a two-story, seven bay brick building with a central recessed double porch in a vernacular Greek Revival style.

It was listed on the National Register of Historic Places in 2002.

References 

Houses on the National Register of Historic Places in Pennsylvania
Farms on the National Register of Historic Places in Pennsylvania
Greek Revival houses in Pennsylvania
Houses completed in 1832
Houses in Franklin County, Pennsylvania
National Register of Historic Places in Franklin County, Pennsylvania